Allium koenigianum, or Koenig's onion, is a species of onion that is endemic to the Erzurum and Çoruh regions of Turkey.

The species is very rare and quite possibly extinct. It is only known from two records dating from the 1920s.

References

koenigianum
Endemic flora of Turkey
Plants described in 1928